The Japan Le Mans Challenge was a series of endurance races held in Japan, for motor racing cars, following the style of the famous Le Mans 24 Hours endurance race held every year in France. 

The 2006 Japan Le Mans Challenge season was the first ever season for the Japan Le Mans Challenge, a series created by SERO, and run under sanctioning from the ACO, to follow 24 Hours of Le Mans rules.  

It began May 14, 2006, and ended October 29, 2006 after only three races.

For the 2006 series, three different Japanese motor racing circuits were used. 

Four different categories of racing cars were permitted ; LMP1, LMP2, GT1, and GT2. 

The 2007 series was not deemed to be a success, and the series was cancelled afterwards.

2006 Pre-season
In the buildup to the first season of JLMC, it was apparent from the start that unlike the Le Mans Series in Europe, JLMC would not start off with great success.  

A lack of commitment from major Japanese teams, especially those involved in Super GT, meant that the entry list for the season was small.  

An official pre-season test at Sportsland Sugo saw only 8 cars showing up.  Even with this, more teams promised to eventually make it to the JLMC grid, including Team Goh, who had earned fame when they won the 2005 24 Hours of Le Mans with the conquering Audi R8.

However, of the teams that did show up, few had quality machinery.  The entire LMP2 class was small sportscars that did not actually fit LMP2 regulations.  LMP1 was able to boast some machinery that fit LMP rules with a Zytek 05S while there was promise of a new Courage LC70 for Mugen Motorsports on the way as the season went on.

GT classes was made up of a large amount of machinery from Super GT, with an ex-Prodrive Ferrari 550-GTS Maranello and JLOC's Super GT Lamborghini Murcielago RG-1 joined by a privateer Mosler MT900R in GT1.  

GT2 was also only able to claim a few competitive entries, with some two Porsche 911 GT3s being mixed with a privateer cars that did not fully reach ACO GT2 specs.

These competitors allowed for the entry list of a mere 12 competitors for the first round at Sportsland Sugo.

Schedule

Season results
Overall winner in bold.

Drivers' Championship

LMP1 standings

LMP2 standings

GT1 standings

GT2 standings

Teams' Championship
Points are awarded to finishers based on how many cars were entered in each class.  For classes with a lower car count, the top five were awarded points in the order of 5-4-3-2-1.  Classes with more entries were awarded points for the top eight in the order of 10-8-6-5-4-3-2-1.

Only the top finishing car in a team scores points towards the championship.

LMP1 standings

LMP2 standings

GT1 standings

GT2 standings

External links
 JLMC Official Website (English)
 JLMC Points Standings
 World Sports Racing Prototypes – Results

Japan Le Mans Challenge
Le Mans Challenge